Chisholm v. Georgia, 2 U.S. (2 Dall.) 419 (1793), is considered the first United States Supreme Court case of significance and impact. Since the case was argued prior to the formal pronouncement of judicial review by Marbury v. Madison (1803), there was little available legal precedent (particularly in U.S. law). The Court in a 4–1 decision ruled in favor of Alexander Chisholm, executor of an estate of a citizen of South Carolina, holding that Article III, Section 2 grants federal courts jurisdiction in cases between a state and a citizen of another state wherein the state is the defendant.

The case was superseded in 1795 by the Eleventh Amendment to the United States Constitution which was considered binding by the Court in Hollingsworth v. Virginia (1798). The Supreme Court formally established sovereign immunity in federal courts in Hans v. Louisiana (1890) and state courts in Alden v. Maine (1999) using the Eleventh Amendment, effectively overturning their decision.

Background of the case
On October 31, 1777, the Executive Council of Georgia authorized Thomas Stone and Edward Davies, as commissioners of the state, to purchase goods from Robert Farquhar, a South Carolina merchant, to help stationed troops in Savannah who were in dire need of supplies. Stone and Davies agreed to give Farquhar $169,613.33 (in indigo or continental currency) for his merchandise. However, at the time of Farquhar's death in 1784, he had not received payment for his merchandise. The estate filed a claim for the debt with the Georgia legislature in 1789, but was met with a committee report refusing payment. Instead, the committee suggested the estate sue Stone and Davies, as they had withdrawn the funds meant for Farquhar from the state treasury.

Prior history 
Alexander Chisholm, a merchant in Charleston and an executor to Farquhar's estate, brought suit against the state of Georgia in the U.S. Circuit Court for the District of Georgia. The circuit court heard the case in October 1791 under the caption of Farquhar's Executor v. Georgia.<ref name="Chisholm v. Georgia: Background and Settlement" Chisholm sought £100,000 sterling in payment and damages. Georgia governor Edward Telfair argued that Georgia was "a free, sovereign and independent State...[and] cannot be drawn or compelled... to answer, against the will of the said State of Georgia, before any Justices of the federal Circuit Court for the District of Georgia or before any Justices of any Court of Law or Equity whatsoever", a stance of sovereign immunity. Associate Justice James Iredell, who heard the case while riding circuit, along with U.S. District Court Judge Nathaniel Pendleton, dismissed the case, citing a lack of jurisdiction under the Judiciary Act of 1789, on grounds that a state could not be sued by a citizen of another state in federal circuit court.

Supreme Court 
Chisholm subsequently filed a new suit before the Supreme Court under its original jurisdiction, likely in the February 1792 term. The case, captioned as Chisholm, Executor v. Georgia, sought damages amounting to $500,000. When no representative for Georgia appeared before the Court in the August 1792 term, plaintiff's counsels John Hallowell and Attorney General Edmund Randolph consented to hold over the case until the February 1793 term. Despite additional provision of notice by the Court, no attorneys or representatives for the state appeared in the February 1793 term. The Court then proceeded to hear Randolph's arguments.

The court's decision
In a four-to-one decision, the Court held for the plaintiff, with Chief Justice John Jay and associate justices William Cushing, James Wilson, and John Blair constituting the majority; only Justice Iredell dissented. (At that time, there was no opinion of the court or majority opinion; the justices delivered their opinions seriatim or individually, in ascending order of seniority.) The Court ruled that Article 3, Section 2, of the Constitution expressly extended federal judicial power to suits between a state and a citizen of another state, and placed that power within the original jurisdiction of the Supreme Court. Moreover, it held, the Constitution provided no exception which limited that authority only to suits where the state was the plaintiff.

Chief Justice John Jay's Opinion 
In his opinion, Chief Justice John Jay begins by breaking down the argument made by the plaintiffs into four different questions:
 Can the State of Georgia, being one of the United States of America, be made a party-defendant in any case, in the Supreme Court of the United States, at the suit of a private citizen, even although he himself is, and his testator was, a citizen of the State of South Carolina?
 If the State of Georgia can be made a party defendant in certain cases, does an action of assumpsit lie against her?
  Is the service of the summons upon the Governor and Attorney General of the State of Georgia, a competent service?
 By what process ought the appearance of the State of Georgia to be enforced?

In the opening words of his opinion, Justice Wilson stated the essential principle on which the case turned: "This is a case of uncommon magnitude. One of the parties to it is a State; certainly respectable, claiming to be sovereign. The question to be determined is, whether this State, so respectable, and whose claim soars so high, is amenable to the jurisdiction of the Supreme Court of the United States? This question, important in itself, will depend on others, more important still; and, may, perhaps, be ultimately resolved into one, no less radical than this 'do the people of the United States form a Nation?'"

Justice Iredell’s Dissent 

In his dissenting opinion, Justice Iredell stated, “A general question of great importance here occurs. What controversy of a civil nature can be maintained against a State by an individual? The framers of the Constitution, I presume, must have meant one of two things: either 1. in the conveyance of that part of the judicial power which did not relate to the execution of the other authorities of the general Government (which it must be admitted are full and discretionary, within the restrictions of the Constitution itself), to refer to antecedent laws for the construction of the general words they use; or, 2. to enable Congress in all such cases to pass all such laws as they might deem necessary and proper to carry the purposes of this Constitution into full effect, either absolutely at their discretion, or at least in cases where prior laws were deficient for such purposes, if any such deficiency existed.” Iredell stated that neither of these things was argued in the case, and reasoned that under common law each State was sovereign, just as under English law, and they could not be sued without their consent.

Subsequent developments
Although Justice Iredell's was the only dissenting opinion, his opinion ultimately became the law of the land. The States, surprised by the decision of the Supreme Court, called for the 11th Amendment to the Constitution, which precludes a State from being sued in Federal Court without that State's consent. By February 1795, 12 of the then 15 states had ratified the 11th Amendment; South Carolina ratified it in 1797, and New Jersey and Pennsylvania took no action on ratification. In 1795, the Eleventh Amendment was ratified to negate the holding in Chisholm v. Georgia.  Under the 11th Amendment, citizens of one state or of foreign countries can only sue a state with the state's consent or if Congress, pursuant to a valid exercise of Fourteenth Amendment remedial powers, abrogates the states' immunity from suit.

See also
Hans v. Louisiana, 134 U.S. 1 (1890)
Edelman v. Jordan, 415 U.S. 651 (1974)
Atascadero State Hospital v. Scanlon, 473 U.S. 234 (1985)
Seminole Tribe of Florida v. Florida, 517 U.S. 44 (1996)
Alden v. Maine, 527 U.S. 706 (1999)
List of United States Supreme Court cases, volume 2

Notes

References
 Jean Edward Smith, John Marshall: Definer Of A Nation, New York: Henry Holt & Company, 1996.
 Jean Edward Smith, The Constitution And American Foreign Policy, St. Paul, MN: West Publishing Company, 1989.
 William Anderson LaBach, The Supreme Court Fails Its First Test: Chisholm v. Georgia, Saarbrücken, Germany, VDM Verlag, 2009.

External links

United States Supreme Court cases
United States Supreme Court cases of the Jay Court
United States Constitution Article Three case law
United States state sovereign immunity case law
Legal history of Georgia (U.S. state)
1793 in United States case law
Abrogated United States Supreme Court decisions